License program product (LPP) is an AIX terminology referring to a complete software product collection including one or more packages and filesets.

Package management systems